Word, Sound and Power are a Jamaican reggae band, formed in 1976 as Peter Tosh's backing band after Tosh left The Wailers. They toured with Tosh in America in 1976, Europe in 1978, and backed him at the One Love Peace Concert. For this concert, their line-up was Sly and Robbie, Al Anderson, Mikey Chung, Robbie Lyn, Keith Sterling, Uziah Thompson and Noel Simms.

Carlton "Santa" Davis (drums) and George "Fully" Fullwood (bass) replaced Sly and Robbie, when they began touring with Black Uhuru (Mykal Rose, Duckie Simpson and Puma Jones).

References

1976 establishments in Jamaica
1980s disestablishments in Jamaica
Jamaican reggae musical groups